Lucky Lake is a village in the Canadian province of Saskatchewan within the Rural Municipality of Canaan No. 225 and Census Division No. 7. The Village is located at the junction of Highway 42, Highway 45 and Highway 646 approximately 90 km northeast of Swift Current, Saskatchewan.

History 
Lucky Lake incorporated as a village on November 23, 1920.

Demographics 

Economy 
Agriculture and agriculture services constitute the largest component of the town's economy. Typical crops grown in the area include durum wheat, spring wheat, peas, lentils, and canola.  Flax, beans and mustard are also grown to a lesser extent.  Nearby Lake Diefenbaker provides water for irrigation so that additional crops such as potatoes can be grown.  Wild West Steelhead, is an aquaculture farm that raises Steelhead Trout in the lake.  The company employs many people in its operations that comprise the steps of egg incubation to the production of finished fillets.

In the past, the provincial government's efforts (via a partnership known as SPUDCO) to create a potato growing industry in the province led to local jobs being created to grow and package potatoes. SPUDCO eventually failed and the local potato growing industry has been slow to recover.

Attractions 
 Palliser Regional Park
 Riverhurst Ferry

See also 

 List of communities in Saskatchewan
 Villages of Saskatchewan
 Lucky Lake Airport

References

Villages in Saskatchewan
Canaan No. 225, Saskatchewan
Division No. 7, Saskatchewan